Goúves is a village and former municipality in the Heraklion regional unit, Crete, Greece. Since the 2011, local government reform it is a part of the municipality Hersonissos, of which it is a municipal unit.

Goúves is better known for its busy summer resort, Káto Goúves. Besides this well developed tourist resort with long sandy beaches, the area has some traditional villages and archaeological sites and Eileithyia caves. To the west of Goúves are the tourist resorts of Kokkíni Háni (also spelled Háni Kokkíni) and Amnísos, both with similar attractions, and, to the east, Crete's largest resort, Hersonisos.

Káto Goúves, just a couple kms. north of the village, is a summer resort.  There is a variety of accommodation (from large hotels to boarding houses and self-catering apartments) . There are many restaurants, bars, nightclubs, and shops.

Villages in the Municipal Unit of Gouves 
Villages in the area include:
 Anopoli - several some minutes from Kokkini Xani village, and 5 km south in the mountains at an altitude of 205 m. 
 Elia Village - located 12 km southeast of Heraklion city, in the inland of Hersonissos Municipality, and just 4.5 km from Kokkini Chani village by the sea. The village is on a small hill, at an altitude of 230 m
 Epano Gouves - located on the south side of Gouves village by the north side of Ederi Mountain, just 18 km east of Heraklion city and just 3 km from Gournes village. 
 Epano Vatheia - is located in the valley of Vatheianos Kampos, at an altitude of 260 m in the inland of Hersonissos Municipality, just 15 km southeast of Heraklion city. 
 Gournes - a village by the sea and located just 15 km east of Heraklion city in the Municipality of Hersonissos. 
 Gouves village - also known as Kato Gouves, this is a village by the sea
 Charasso village - located southeast of Heraklion city just 27 km from the airport and at an altitude of 388 m, in the inland of Hersonissos Municipality just 10 km south of Gouves village. 
 Kalo Chorio - located just 7 km south of Gouves village and 25 km southeast of Heraklion city
 Karteros Village - located by the sea just 8 km from Heraklion city and is the natural limit of Hersonissos Municipality
Kato Vatheia village - located between Vatheianos Kampos and Epano Vatheia
 Kokkini Chani - a village by the sea and located just 12 km from Heraklion city. 
 Koksari village - located 23 km southeast of Heraklion city and just 5 km from Gouves village
 Skoteino - located south of Gouves village
 Vatheianos Kampos - located 13 km east of Heraklion city and borders Kokkini Chani village.

Points of interest in Municipal Unit of Gouves

Amnisos 
Amnísos and its long sandy beach lies about 7 km East of Heraklion city, just beside the airport and in front of the islet of Dia. There is another Minoan villa in the area dating from 1600 B.C., where some frescoes that are now in Heraklion Archaeological Museum were found.

CretAquarium 
One of the largest and most modern aquariums in Europe, CretAquarium was founded and operates as part of the HCMR. It is geographically located on the north-western part of the former American Base of Gournes, where together with the premises of the research institutions of HCMR forms THALASSOKOSMOS - the largest centre for marine science and promotion of the Mediterranean sea world.

Dia island 
Dia island is located 6 miles northeast of Heraklion city. it is uninhabited and the home of seabirds and species associated with coastal cliffs. It is one of the NATURA protected areas, due to its status as biotope for endemic plants. Legend has it that Dia island used to be a colossal sea creature that came close to Crete and then Zeus turned it into stone with a powerful thunderbolt, thus creating the island.

Eileithyia Cave 
This cave lies 1 km inland from Amnísos. It was an important sanctuary since Neolithic times. It was dedicated to Eileithyia, a Greek goddess of fertility and childbirth of Cretan origin. The cave is rectangular, 64m long and 9-12m wide. After the entrance there is an antechamber, which leads to a rectangular room surrounded by cylindrical stalagmites which were probably worshipped by the pilgrims. At the cave's mouth there is a square, known as "The Square of Altars". This courtyard may have been used in ceremonies. The cave remained in use until late Roman times.

Gorge of Karteros 
Gorge of Karteros also known as Astrakiano Faragi is located in the Municipal Unit of Gouves and can be entered by Karteros village on the southeast side. It is a hiking trail with ponds and small waterfalls.

Kera Eleousa Monastery 
One of the most important monasteries in the Municipal Unit of Gouves, located near Voritsi village just some minutes away from Gouves village. A fortress type monastery with significant archaeological ruins. Visitors can see the church, the monks' cells and the yard of the monastery.

Minoan villa of Kokkíni Háni 
The summer resort of Kokkíni Háni lies in Vathiano Kambo, about 13 km East of Heraklion and Northwest of Goúves. At the spot known as Nirou Háni, archaeologists found a well preserved Minoan villa dating from the New Palace period. The villa had two storeys, was about 1000 sq. meters large and had all the typical features of the Minoan architecture: two paved courts, connecting corridors, storage rooms, light wells, shrines, etc. About 40 tripods and huge double axes were found in some rooms, suggesting that the owner of the villa might have been a high priest. Like most of the Minoan buildings, the villa was destroyed by a big fire. The finds from the excavations are now displayed in the Heraklion Archaeological Museum.

Monastery of Saint John Theologos
This monastery (Agios Ioannis Theologos in Greek) lies in a verdant setting southeast of the village of Anópoli. It used to be part of the Saint George (Agios Giorgios) monastery, which is located to the North, which was abandoned following the frequent pirate raids  in the 15th and 16th centuries and all the monks moved to the monastery of Saint John. During the Ottoman occupation of Crete, the monastery hosted Cretan revolutionaries and  a secret school, something that lead the Ottomans to destroy it and kill the monks and the people of Anópoli in July 1896. The monastery was founded again some years later.

Skotino Cave

This cave, one of the largest of the hundred caves in Crete, is located high on a hill northwest of the village of Skotinó, a few kilometers inland south of Goúves. It is also known as Ayía Paraskevi cave, this name coming from the church built on top of it. The cave is 160m deep and 36m wide. The first archaeological researches on the site were done by Arthur Evans, the well-known British archaeologist who unearthed and partially restored Knossos in the early 20th century. A more comprehensive exploration was done by French and Greek archaeologists in the 1960s. They found a number of bronze and ceramic votive offerings, the oldest of them dating from the earliest Minoan periods, suggesting the cave was an important sacred shrine dedicated to a female fertility deity, possibly Britomartis. The cave was still used in Classical Greek and Roman eras, when the fertility goddess Artemis or her Roman equivalent Diana replaced the Minoan deity.

Gallery

References

Bibliography
 Fisher, John and Garvey, Geoff (2007). The Rough Guide to Crete, 7th edition.

External links 

 Gouves Travel Guide from traveleye.com

Populated places in Heraklion (regional unit)